Seddar Karaman (born 3 January 1994) is a Turkish footballer who plays as a forward for 1922 Konyaspor on loan from Konyaspor. He made his Süper Lig debut on 1 February 2014.

References

External links
 
 
 
 
 Seddar Karaman at Soccerway

1994 births
Living people
Sportspeople from Antalya
Turkish footballers
Antalyaspor footballers
Denizlispor footballers
Süper Lig players
TFF First League players
Association football forwards